Dolščaki is a settlement in the Municipality of Velike Lašče in Slovenia. Its territory includes the hamlet of Kurja Vas along the main road from Rašica to Rob. The area is part of the traditional region of Lower Carniola and is now included in the Central Slovenia Statistical Region.

References

External links
Dolščaki on Geopedia

Populated places in the Municipality of Velike Lašče